Antonio Leal Labrín (10 January 1950 – 17 November 2021) was a Chilean politician. A member of the Party for Democracy, he served in the Chamber of Deputies of Chile from 1998 to 2010 and was its President from 2006 to 2007.

References

1950 births
2021 deaths
Chilean politicians
Presidents of the Chamber of Deputies of Chile
People from Santiago